"The By-road to Glenroe" was a song from the Irish television series Glenroe, performed by actor Mick Lally in character as Miley Byrne in honour of his wife Biddy. The song was released as a single in 1990, with the show's theme song performed by Jim Lockhart as the B-side, and was Number 1 on the Irish charts for five weeks.

References

1990 singles
Irish Singles Chart number-one singles
Year of song missing
Song articles with missing songwriters